The Camden Free Public Library Main Building is the first former main library of the Camden, New Jersey public library system. Designed by Herbert D. Hale and Henry G. Morse, the building was constructed with a grant from the Carnegie Corporation and opened in 1905. It closed in 1986 with the relocation of the library's main branch to the former South Jersey Gas, Electric and Traction Company Office Building. In 1992, the building was placed on the state and national registers of historic places. The building has fallen into state of serious disrepair. In 2003, funding was found for its stabilization, with the hope that it would be preserved and re-used.

The city's once extensive library system has been beleaguered by financial difficulties. In 2010, it threatened to close but was incorporated by the county library system. Nonetheless, the main branch did close in February 2011.

See also

Cooper Library in Johnson Park
List of Carnegie libraries in New Jersey
National Register of Historic Places listings in Camden County, New Jersey
Carnegie library

References

External links 
 Carnegie Library Camden
 Waymarking
 Postcards of Camden
 History of the Camden Free Public Library

Library buildings completed in 1905
Buildings and structures in Camden, New Jersey
Libraries on the National Register of Historic Places in New Jersey
History of Camden, New Jersey
Neoclassical architecture in New Jersey
Carnegie libraries in New Jersey
National Register of Historic Places in Camden County, New Jersey
New Jersey Register of Historic Places
1905 establishments in New Jersey